Cidade Proibida (English title: Forbidden City) is a Brazilian television series that aired on Rede Globo from 9 September 2017 to 19 December 2017. The series is based on the comic book series O Corno Que Sabia Demais, written by Wander Antunes. It stars Vladimir Brichta, Regiane Alves, José Loreto, Aílton Graça, Adriana Lessa, and Maurício Rizzo.

A second season was planned, however, it was cancelled due to the low ratings of the series.

Premise 
Set in Rio de Janeiro in the 1950s, the series follows Zózimo Barbosa, a former police officer who becomes a detective specializing in cases of adultery. He is accompanied by call girl Marli, police officer Paranhos, and trickster Bonitão.

Cast 
 Vladimir Brichta as Zózimo Barbosa
 Regiane Alves as Marli
 José Loreto as Adalberto Cruz "Bonitão"
 Aílton Graça as Paranhos
 Adriana Lessa as Gracinda
 Maurício Rizzo as Diogo Freitas

References

External links 
 

2017 Brazilian television series debuts
2017 Brazilian television series endings
Portuguese-language television shows
Rede Globo original programming